Wangerland is a municipality in the district of Friesland, Lower Saxony, Germany. It is situated on the North Sea coast, approximately 20 km northwest of Wilhelmshaven, and 10 km north of Jever. Its seat is in the village Hohenkirchen.

History
First settlements are dated on the 2nd century B.C.

Subdivision
The municipality consists of the following villages: Altgarmssiel, Förrien, Friederikensiel, Hohenkirchen, Hooksiel, Horumersiel, Middoge, Minsen, Neugarmssiel, Oldorf, Schillig, Tettens, Waddewarden and Wiarden.

References

External links
 Official site 
 Churches in Wangerland 

Friesland (district)